The prefectures of the Central African Republic are divided into 71 sub-prefectures. The sub-prefectures are listed below, by prefecture.

Bamingui-Bangoran Prefecture

 Bamingui
 Ndélé

Bangui Commune

 Bangui

Basse-Kotto Prefecture

 Alindao
 Kembé
 Mingala
 Mobaye
 Satema
 Zangba

Haut-Mbomou Prefecture

 Djemah
 Obo
 Zemio
 Bambouti
 Mboki

Haute-Kotto Prefecture

 Bria
 Ouadda
 Yalinga

Kémo Prefecture

 Dekoa
 Sibut
 Mala
 Ndjoukou

Lobaye Prefecture

 Boda
 Mbaiki
 Mongoumba
 Boganangone
 Boganda

Lim-Pendé Prefecture
 Paoua
 Ngaoundaye
 Ndim
 Kodi
 Taley

Mambéré Prefecture
 Carnot
 Amada-Gaza
 Gadzi
 Senkpa-Mbaéré

Mambéré-Kadéï Prefecture

 Berbérati
 Gamboula
 Dédé-Makouba
 Sosso-Nakombo

Mbomou Prefecture

 Bakouma
 Bangassou
 Rafai
 Gambo
 Ouango

Nana-Grébizi Economic Prefecture

 Kaga-Bandoro
 Mbrès

Nana-Mambéré Prefecture

 Baboua
 Baoro
 Bouar
 Abba

Ombella-M'Poko Prefecture

 Bimbo
 Boali
 Damara
 Bogangolo
 Yaloke
 Bossembele

Ouaka Prefecture

 Bakala
 Bambari
 Grimari
 Ippy
 Kouango

Ouham Prefecture

 Bossangoa
 Markounda
 Moyenne-Sido
 Nana-Bakassa
 Nanga-Boguila

Ouham-Fafa Prefecture
 Batangafo
 Bouca
 Kabo
 Sido

Ouham-Pendé Prefecture

 Bocaranga
 Bozoum
 Bossemptele
 Koui

Sangha-Mbaéré Economic Prefecture

 Bambio
 Bayanga
 Nola

Vakaga Prefecture

 Birao
 Ouanda Djallé

See also
 Prefectures of the Central African Republic

External links
 Website about Central African Republic

 
Subdivisions of the Central African Republic
Central African Republic, Subprefectures
Central African Republic 2
Subprefectures, Central African Republic
Central African Republic geography-related lists